GRB 100621A was a gamma-ray burst observed on June 21, 2010, by the Swift spacecraft. It is the second brightest gamma-ray burst yet observed, after GRB 130427A.  The distance is reported to be approximately five billion light years, far outside our own Milky Way Galaxy.

References

100621A
June 2010 events
Astronomical objects discovered in 2010